The 1998 FIBA World Championship was the 13th FIBA World Championship, an international basketball tournament held by the International Basketball Federation and hosted in Greece from 29 July to 9 August 1998. The tournament was contested by 16 nations and the matches were played in two venues in Athens and Piraeus.

Because of the National Basketball Association lockout and unlike in the previous championship, the USA Basketball Association was unable to send a team composed of NBA players, thus causing the American national team roster consisting of professional basketball players playing in Europe and two college players. The tournament was won by FR Yugoslavia, in their first participation after the breakup of Yugoslavia, defeating Russia in the final 64–62.

Venues

Squads

Qualification

There were 16 teams taking part in the 2014 World Cup of Basketball. After the 1996 Olympics, the continental allocation for FIBA Americas was reduced by one when the United States won the Olympic tournament, automatically qualifying them for the 1998 World Cup.

 Host nation: 1 berth
 1996 Summer Olympics: 12 teams competing for 1 berth, removed from that country's FIBA zone.
 FIBA Oceania: 3 teams competing for 1 berth
 FIBA Europe: 16 teams competing for 5 berths
 FIBA Africa: 9 teams competing for 2 berths
 FIBA Americas: 10 teams competing for 4 berths
 FIBA Asia: 15 teams competing for 2 berths

Qualified teams

Draw

Preliminary round

The top three teams in each group advance to the second round, into either Group E or F. The fourth place team in each group moves onto the 13th–16th classification.

Group A

Group Β

Group C

Group D

Second round
First three teams in each group of the first group phase qualify to the second phase, creating two new groups of six teams. The final standings also take in account the results of previous round matches.

Group Ε

Group F

Classification round

13th–16th classification

Semifinals

Fifteenth place playoff

Thirteenth place playoff

9th–12th classification

Semifinals

Eleventh place playoff

Ninth place playoff

5th–8th classification

Semifinals

Seventh place playoff

Fifth place playoff

Final round

Quarterfinals

Semifinals

Third place playoff

Final

Awards

Final rankings

All-Tournament Team 

  Vasili Karasev
  Alberto Herreros
  Dejan Bodiroga — MVP
  Gregor Fučka
  Željko Rebrača

Top scorers

References

External links
 
 

 
1998
1998 in basketball
1998–99 in Greek basketball
International basketball competitions hosted by Greece
Sports competitions in Athens
Sports competitions in Piraeus
July 1998 sports events in Europe
August 1998 sports events in Europe